Thomas Richards (born 22 March 1948) is an Australian former actor on television soap operas. He is best known for roles including in Matlock Police as Steven York from 1972 and 1976 and in the 1980s soap opera Sons and Daughters as David Palmer from 1982 until 1987, opposite co-star Leila Hayes.

Career
Richards began his acting career at Twelfth Night Theatre in Brisbane. One of his roles was in The Rose and the Ring in 1971. He later moved to Melbourne where he began work in television. Richards played guest roles in Crawford Production series Homicide, Division 4 and Ryan, before gaining the permanent role of in Network Ten police drama Matlock Police in the 1970s as Detective Steve York. After that series was cancelled he had a regular role in soap opera The Box during its final year in 1977, before joining Sons and Daughters.

He played Lawrie Benson in Network Ten soap opera Richmond Hill for most of its 12-month run in 1988. Richards also had guest roles in many popular TV series including Chopper Squad, The Young Doctors, The Sullivans (in episode 194 in 1977), The Flying Doctors, and A Country Practice, Pacific Drive, Water Rats and All Saints.

He appeared in Home and Aways first season in 1988 as Graham Ridge, and played a more prominent role as Murdock "Mud" Roberts in 1995.

In 2009 he appeared as Mitch in the Sydney Theatre Company's acclaimed production of A Streetcar Named Desire.

Filmography

References

External links
 

1945 births
Living people
Australian male soap opera actors
Male actors from Brisbane